Khan Umara Khan of Jandol (c. 18601904), also called "The Afghan Napoleon", was a Pashtun chief on the north-western frontier of British India, who was chiefly responsible for the Chitral Expedition of 1895. Umar khan started his series of conquest and battles from Dir, Swat, Bajaour, kunar, kafiristan and in 1892 Umara khan attacked Chitral and occupied Chitral.

Life
He was the younger son of the Khan of Jandol; but he killed his elder brother, seized the throne, and made himself a power on the frontier.

In 1894 he held undisputed sway over almost the whole of Bajour, when his restless ambition caused him to interfere in the internal affairs of Chitral. He instigated Afzal ul-Mulk, a son of Chitral's Mehtar Aman ul-Mulk, to murder his brother Nizam ul-Mulk, and then overthrew the fratricide and supported the claims of his uncle Sher Afzul to the throne. The Government of British India intervened and ordered Umra Khan to leave Chitral. When he refused, the Chitral Expedition was despatched; Umra Khan was driven into exile in Afghanistan, and died there in 1904.
He is declared as the Nepoleon of Pathans by Winston Churchill in his book titled the Malakand Field Force. The book was written by Mr. Churchill when he visited the area as a war correspondent with British Forces.

It is also known that Umara Khan participated in the Ambela battle when he was only a few years old. The grandfather of Umara Khan participated along with three thousand mujahideen including Umara Khan in the battle.

Umara Khan became leader of the Dir state in 1881 in a very young age. He raised war against the British in 1896 and captured 120 British soldiers including officers named Edward. The captives later confirmed that they were well treated and were provided food of their choice.

References

History of Khyber Pakhtunkhwa
1860s births
1903 deaths
Pashtun people
History of Chitral
North-West Frontier Province
Military history of Khyber Pakhtunkhwa